Kuusalu is a village in Kuusalu Parish, Harju County in northern Estonia. It has a population of 221 (as of 1 January 2010).

Gallery

References

External links
 Kuusalu Parish

Villages in Harju County
Kreis Harrien